Joseph Hsu King-shing also transliterated as Hsu King-Seng (1910s to 11 February 1986) was a Chinese professional footballer and football manager. Born in Shanghai, Hsu moved to Hong Kong to continue his professional career and never returned to the mainland China to play nor coach. He coached both Hong Kong and Republic of China (Taiwan), as well as managed Singtao for more than a decade.

Hsu was nicknamed Left-foot King during his career.

Club career
Hsu started his career in Shanghai. Due to the Second Sino-Japanese War, Hsu, along his international teammate, Liu Shih-Tsan, left for Hong Kong to continue his career.

He played for Kowloon Chinese in 1937–38 season; Eastern in 1939–40, 1940–41 and 1941–42 season as well as the scratch team of South China in May 1941 for off-season friendlies.

His career was interrupted during Japanese occupation of Hong Kong from December 1941 to 1945.

After the war, he was a player for Singtao as a midfielder from 1947 to 1948 and again in May 1950 as a member of a scratch team for friendly matches He also played for Singtao in 1951–52 season to 1953–54 season.

He also played for St Joseph's in 1948–49 season and Kwong Wah in 1950–51 season.

International career
It was reported that along with Liu Shih-Tsan, they represented China in international tournaments in Shanghai.

Due to the sponsorship of Singtao Sports Club owner Aw Hoe, Hsu was in the provisional squad of China national football team to 1948 Olympics. However, he was not selected to the final squad. Hsu traveled with team as an officer. According to Lee Wai Tong, on top of as a footballer of Singtao Sports Club, Hsu was also employed as a journalist of sister company Sing Tao Daily. Hsu traveled with the Olympic team on the expense of the newspaper.

Hsu also represented Hong Kong in 1949 Hong Kong–Vietnam Interport against Saigon in 1949. Both teams were not a member of FIFA at that time.

Coaching career

Kwong Wah
After retirement, he was the coach of several team. Hsu coached Kwong Wah in 1956–57 season.

Singtao
In 1961–62 season Hsu was hired as the manager of the football department of Singtao Sports Club. Ge also served as a coach. Singtao relegated in 1963. Hsu led Singtao to finished as 1963–64 runner-up of the second division. At that time, Singtao shared their ground with Hong Kong FC, a club with expatriate background. Hsu was the manager and coach of Singtao in 1966–67 season, before leading Republic of China (Taiwan) in July 1967. He returned as manager in the 1967–68 season. He was the manager of Singtao in the next few seasons: (1968–69, 1969–70, 1970–71, 1971–72 and 1972–73) Since 1970 he also handed over some of the coaching job to his assistant Tam Hon Sun. In 1972–73 season, Tam formally known as coach during Hsu's vacation to 1972 Summer Olympics. Ironically, the team relegated in 1973.

According to Hong Kong Companies Registry, Hsu was also the shareholder of Sing Tao Sports Club Limited along with the actual owner Sally Aw (Aw Sian, sister of Aw Hoe). Hsu and Aw each owned 1 share of HK$100 each, making the total paid-in share capital was HK$200. However, only Aw and Robert Eli Low, a solicitor, were the company directors. Sing Tao Sports Club Limited, incorporated on 27 September 1968, was the legal entity to run the sports club as a professional football club.

Interim coaches

Hong Kong Chinese
He was selected as guest coach for "Hong Kong Chinese" in January 1963 for a match against West Germany-West Berlin mixed team as well as a match against South Korea in September in the Government Stadium. During as a guest coach for the Hong Kong Football Association in January 1969 for the Hong Kong team, he also collectively trained "Hong Kong Chinese" and Hong Kong League XI, leading "Hong Kong Chinese" to draw with Odense in 1969 Lunar New Year Cup (second of the three friendlies in the tournament). At that time it was a controversy, as "Hong Kong Chinese" was the feeder team of Republic of China (Taiwan); the players were based in Hong Kong but chose to represent China (Republic of China).

In July 1969 he once again leading Hong Kong Chinese representative team for 1969 Ho Ho Cup, a friendly tournament against Malaysian Chinese, just a few weeks after leading Hong Kong League XI in exhibition matches that played in Hong Kong in June, as well as leading Singtao in exhibition matches that played in South Africa. However, the cup was later canceled.

In May 1970 he was nominated as the guest coach of "Hong Kong Chinese" for a match against Olaria.

Republic of China (Taiwan)
Hsu led Republic of China (Taiwan) for 1968 AFC Asian Cup qualification, Pestabola Merdeka and 1968 Olympics qualification in summer 1967. Despite known officially as Republic of China (or still claiming the name China), the government only controlled Taiwan and some islands after losing the civil war. Ironically, the national team was composed of mainly Hong Kong based Chinese diaspora, which they refused to represent Hong Kong nor newly established People's Republic of China.

Hong Kong businessman Gordon Wu was also nominated as [honorary] manager of the national team.

Hong Kong / Hong Kong League XI 
Hsu was also nominated as manager and guest coach for the Hong Kong Football Association in November 1968 on a three-month contract, for friendlies against 1860 Munich in December and 1969 Lunar New Year Cup against Odense. He later became a volunteering coach for Hong Kong FA in the whole year, on top of his job in Singtao.

The exhibition match against 1860 Munich was later expended to three matches, with Hsu selected players from Hong Kong, Hong Kong League XI and Hong Kong Chinese to the training camp, despite criticism on training players that ineligible to Hong Kong. He did it once again in January 1969 for the preparation for the match against Odense.

In June 1969 he was the coach of Hong Kong League XI for the exhibition matches against a team from UK and Borussia Mönchengladbach.

Hsu was also nominated as coach for Hong Kong team for 1970 Lunar New Year Cup, but assisted by three younger coaches who completed their training in Japan. Hong Kong 2–6 losing to Slavia Prague. In May 1970, he was nominated by Hong Kong as manager and coach for 1970 Jakarta Anniversary Tournament. Hong Kong finished as the fourth. Hsu also refused to lead Hong Kong in 1970 Pestabola Merdeka, due to the clash with Singtao pre-season tour, making Jakarta Anniversary Tournament the only international match he led.

Second term of Republic of China (Taiwan)
After handing over the coaching of Hong Kong team and Hong Kong League XI to various coaches, Hsu was nominated as guest coach of Republic of China (Taiwan) again in June 1971 for 1971 Pestabola Merdeka. However, the players were still selected in Hong Kong by The Chinese Amateur Athletic Federation of Hong Kong. Before the start of the tournament in August, Hsu was replaced by Pau King Yin. It was reported that Hsu had kidney stone in June 1971, rumoring that he cannot join the pre-season tour of Singtao starting on 24 June.

Other career
Hsu was the member of the first board of Hong Kong Chinese Footballers' Fraternity in 1956. Hsu became the chairman of Hong Kong Chinese Footballers' Fraternity in 1968–69 financial year. His term was extended in October 1972 by re-election. He was re-elected again in 1973 and 1976.

Personal life
Hsu's daughter married a footballer, which the father of Hsu's son-in-law was Fung King Cheong, also a footballer and manager of Singtao.

Hsu's son Louis Hsu Che-Shek is a tennis player who represented Hong Kong, as well as a medical doctor. Louis Hsu was involved in the invention of halo-pelvic traction, a medical operation led by John O'Brien. Louis Hsu also wrote some research papers on the topic.

Hsu died in Queen Mary Hospital, Hong Kong Island on 11 February 1986.

Footnotes

References

Chinese footballers
Hong Kong footballers
Hong Kong international footballers
Chinese football managers
Hong Kong football managers
Sing Tao SC players
Sing Tao SC managers
Hong Kong First Division League players
Hong Kong national football team managers
Chinese Taipei national football team managers
Footballers from Shanghai
Year of birth missing
1986 deaths
Association footballers not categorized by position